Yongping may refer to:

Locations
 Yongping County, a county in Yunnan, China
 Yongping Prefecture, a former prefecture of Beizhili in imperial China, now known as Lulong, Hebei
 Yongping Township (永坪乡), a township in Li County, Gansu, China
 Yongping, Jinggu County, a town in Jinggu Dai and Yi Autonomous County, Yunnan, China

Historical eras
Yongping (58–75), era name used by Emperor Ming of Han
Yongping (291), era name used by Emperor Hui of Jin
Yongping (508–512), era name used by Emperor Xuanwu of Northern Wei
Yongping (617–618), era name used by Li Mi (Sui dynasty)